Stigmella kasyi is a moth of the family Nepticulidae. It is only known from eastern Afghanistan.

The larvae feed on Quercus baloot. They mine the leaves of their host plant.

External links
The Quercus Feeding Stigmella Species Of The West Palaearctic: New Species, Key And Distribution (Lepidoptera: Nepticulidae)

Nepticulidae
Moths described in 2003
Endemic fauna of Afghanistan
Moths of Asia